This is a list of environmental research institutes, by country or region. These organizations undertake research on the sustainable management of resources, including water, energy and biodiversity.

Australia 
 Centre for Energy and Environmental Markets (CEEM)
 Cooperative Research Centre
 Environment Institute, University of Adelaide
 Hawkesbury Institute for the Environment (HIE), University of Western Sydney
 Advanced Water Management Centre (AWMC), the University of Queensland
ANSTO

Canada 

 McMaster Institute of Environment and Health (MIEH)
 University of Toronto School of the Environment

Colombia 
 International Center for Tropical Agriculture (CIAT) (Centro Internacional de Agricultura Tropical)

Denmark 
 Environmental Assessment Institute (EAI)
 Global Biodiversity Information Facility (GBIF) (secretariat)
 Danish Centre for Environment and Energy (DCE)

Estonia 
 Estonian Environmental Research Centre (EERC) 
 Estonian Environmental Research Institute (operates within the EERC)

European Union 
 European Molecular Biology Laboratory (EMBL)

Finland 
 Finnish Environment Institute

France 
 Curie Institute (Paris)

Germany 
 0ecologic institute
 Helmholtz Centre for Environmental Research
 Mercator Research Institute on Global Commons and Climate Change
 Öko-Institut
 Wuppertal Institute for Climate, Environment and Energy

Ghana 
 Institute for Environment and Sanitation Studies (IESS)

Greece

 Kalamos Island biological field station

Hong Kong SAR
 Research Institute for Sustainable Urban Development (RISUD) at PolyU
 Research Centre for Sustainable Hong Kong (CSHK) at City University

India 
 Center for Environmental Nuclear Research (CENR)
 Center for Environmental Planning and Technology (CEPT)
 Indian Agricultural Research Institute (IARI)
 National Environmental Engineering Research Institute (NEERI)
 The Energy and Resources Institute (TERI)
 Centre for Environment Education (CEE)
 Sri Paramakalyani Centre for Environmental Sciences (SPKCES)
 Centre for Science and Environment  (CSE)
  Nalanda University Centre - Tribhuvan College 
Centre for Climate Change Research, Indian Institute of Tropical Meteorology, Ministry of Earth Sciences, Government of India (CCCR)

Iran
International Research Center for Water and Environment  (IRCWE)
Zenderud Environmental Research Center  (ZERC)

Ireland
Environmental Research Institute (ERI)

Israel 
 Arava Institute for Environmental Studies (AIES)
 Israel Institute for Biological Research (IBR)

Italy 
 Institute of Ecosystem Study (CNR-ISE)

Japan 
 Institute of Cetacean Research (ICR)
 Institute for Global Environmental Strategies (IGES)

Kazakhstan 
 Sustainable Kazakhstan Research Institute (SKRI)

Kenya 
National Environment Management Authority (NEMA)

Netherlands 
 Energy Research Centre of the Netherlands (ECN)
 Netherlands Institute of Ecology (NIOO-KNAW)
 Royal Netherlands Institute for Sea Research (NIOZ)

Nigeria 
 Centre for Environmental Research & Training (CERT)
 Institute of Environmental Accountants

New Zealand 
 Environmental Research Institute (University of Waikato)
 Centre for Sustainability
 GNS Science (formerly the Institute of Geological and Nuclear Sciences)
 NIWA (National Institute of Water and Atmospheric Research)
 Te Waiora Joint Institute for Freshwater Management (University of Waikato and NIWA)
 Cawthron Institute
 ESR (Institute of Environmental Science and Research)
 Manaaki Whenua Landcare Research

Norway 
 Centre for International Climate and Environmental Research

Panama 
 Smithsonian Tropical Research Institute

Philippines 
 Environmental and Climate Change Research Institute - ECCRI

Poland 
 Curie Institute (Warsaw)

Portugal 

Environmental Health Institute (ISAMB)

Romania 
 National R&D Institute for Industrial Ecology - ECOIND

Russia 
 Mir Environmental Effects Payload (MEEP)

Spain 
 Institute of Environmental Science and Technology, ICTA UAB

South Korea 

 Korea Environment Institute (KEI)
 National Institute of Environmental Research (NIER)

Sweden 
 Stockholm Environment Institute
 Stockholm Resilience Centre

Switzerland 
 Center for Development and Environment (CDE)
 Centre for International Environmental Studies (CIES)

Taiwan
 Research Center for Climate Change and Sustainable Development
 Research Center for Future Earth (NTU RCFE)
 Centre for Global Change and Sustainability Science Center (CGCSS)

United Kingdom 

 Cabot Institute, University of Bristol
 Center for Ecology and Hydrology (CEH)
 Chartered Institute of Environmental Health (CIEH)
 Durrell Institute of Conservation and Ecology
 European Bioinformatics Institute (EBI)
 Grantham Institute - Climate Change and Environment, Imperial College London
 Centre for Environmental Policy (CEP), Imperial College London
 Institute of Biological, Environmental and Rural Sciences (IBERS), Wales
 Earthwatch Europe
 Institute of Zoology (IoZ)
 International Institute for Environment and Development (IIED)
 National Institute for Environmental eScience (NIEeS)
 Oxford Environmental Change Institute 
 UCL Institute for Sustainable Resources (ISR)
 Tyndall Centre for Climate Change Research

United States 

 Botanical Research Institute of Texas (BRIT)
 Center for Environmental Legal Studies (CELS), USA 
 Center for Global Change & Earth Observations (CGCEO), USA 
 Center for Law, Energy & the Environment at Berkeley Law (CLEE) 
 Cary Institute of Ecosystem Studies
 Conard Environmental Research Area (CERA), Iowa
 Cooperative Institute for Arctic Research, Alaska
 Cooperative Institute for Climate and Ocean Research (CICOR)
 Cooperative Institute for Climate Applications and Research (CICAR)
 Cooperative Institute for Climate Science (CICS)
 Cooperative Institute for Great Lakes Research (CIGLR)
 Cooperative Institute for Marine and Atmospheric Studies (CIMAS)
 Cooperative Institute for Mesoscale Meteorological Studies (CIMMS)
 Cooperative Institute for Research in Environmental Sciences (CIRES)
 Cooperative Institute for Research in the Atmosphere (CIRA)
 Cornell Laboratory of Ornithology, New York
 The Earth Institute, Columbia University, New York
 Earth System Research Laboratory (ESRL)
Earthwatch Institute, Boston, Massachusetts
 Energy and Environmental Research Center (EERC), North Dakota
 Environmental and Energy Study Institute (EESI), Washington, DC
 Florida Environmental Research Institute (FERI)
 Florida Institute of Oceanography (FIO)
 Global Energy Network Institute (GENI), California
 Global Environment Facility (GEF), Washington, DC (secretariat)
 Graham Sustainability Institute, University of Michigan
 Institute at Brown for Environment and Society (IBES), Brown University, Providence, Rhode Island
 Institute on the Environment, University of Minnesota (IonE), St. Paul, Minnesota
 Integrated Taxonomic Information System (ITIS-North America), Washington, DC (secretariat)
 National Severe Storms Laboratory (NSSL)
 National Snow and Ice Data Center (NSIDC)
 Pacific Marine Environmental Laboratory (PMEL)
 Property and Environment Research Center (PERC), Montana
 Smithsonian Environmental Research Center (SERC)
 Southern California Coastal Water Research Project Authority (SCCWRP)
 UC Davis Tahoe Environmental Research Center (TERC)
 UCLA Institute of the Environment and Sustainability, University of California at Los Angeles
 USC Wrigley Institute for Environmental Studies (WIES)
 Yale Center for Environmental Law and Policy

See also 

 List of forest research institutes
 Lists of environmental topics

References

 
Research institutes
Research
Environmental research
Environmental research
International research institutes
Sustainability organizations
Research institutes